DHCP is the Dynamic Host Configuration Protocol, one of the protocols in the TCP/IP networking suite.

DHCP may also refer to:
			
 Decentralized Hospital Computer Program, an information system used throughout the United States Department of Veterans Affairs
 Directed Hamiltonian cycle problem, an instance of Hamiltonian cycle problem for a directed graph
 Double hexagonal close packed, in crystallography

See also
 DHCPv6, a version of DHCP for the IPv6 networking suite
 High-bandwidth Digital Content Protection (HDCP)